Aretidris is a genus of ants belonging to the family Formicidae.

The species of this genus are found in Southeastern Asia.

Species
Species:

Aretidris buenaventei 
Aretidris clousei

References

Ants
Ant genera